The 1954 Florida Gators football team represented the University of Florida during the 1954 college football season. The season was the fifth for Bob Woodruff as the Florida Gators football team's head coach. The Gators' standout players included running back Mal Hammack. The season was one of mixed results for the Gators: their best-ever Southeastern Conference (SEC) win–loss record, balanced by five overall losses. The highlights of the season were five SEC wins over the fifth-ranked Georgia Tech Yellow Jackets (13–12), Auburn Tigers (19–13), Kentucky Wildcats (21–7), Mississippi State Maroons (7–0) and Tennessee Volunteers (14–0). Woodruff's 1954 Florida Gators finished 5–5 overall and 5–2 in the SEC, placing third in the twelve-team conference—their best SEC showing to date.

Schedule

References

Florida
Florida Gators football seasons
Florida Gators football